An end mill is a type of milling cutter, a cutting tool used in industrial milling applications.  It is distinguished from the drill bit in its application, geometry, and manufacture. While a drill bit can only cut in the axial direction, most milling bits can cut in the radial direction. Not all mills can cut axially; those designed to cut axially are known as end mills.

End mills are used in milling applications such as profile milling, tracer milling, face milling, and plunging.

Types 
Several broad categories of end- and face-milling tools exist, such as center-cutting versus non-center-cutting (whether the mill can take plunging cuts); and categorization by number of flutes; by helix angle; by material; and by coating material. Each category may be further divided by specific application and special geometry.

A very popular helix angle, especially for general cutting of metal materials, is 30°. For finishing end mills, it is common to see more tight spiral, with helix angles 45° or 60°. Straight flute end mills (helix angle 0°) are used in special applications, like milling plastics or composites of epoxy and glass. Straight flute end mills were also used historically for metal cutting before invention of helical flute end mill by Carl A. Bergstrom of Weldon Tool Company in 1918.

There exist end mills with variable flute helix or pseudo-random helix angle, and discontinuous flute geometries, to help break material into smaller pieces while cutting (improving chip evacuation and reducing risk of jamming) and reduce tool engagement on big cuts. Some modern designs also include small features like the corner chamfer and chipbreaker. While more expensive, due to more complex design and manufacturing process, such end mills can last longer due to less wear and improve productivity in high speed machining (HSM) applications.

It is becoming increasingly common for traditional solid end mills to be replaced by more cost-effective inserted cutting tools (which, though more expensive initially, reduce tool-change times and allow for the easy replacement of worn or broken cutting edges rather than the entire tool).

End mills are sold in both imperial and metric shank and cutting diameters.  In the USA, metric is readily available, but it is only used in some machine shops and not others; in Canada, due to the country's proximity to the US, much the same is true. In Asia and Europe, metric diameters are standard.

Geometry and tools 

A variety of grooves, slots, and pockets in the work-piece may be produced from a variety of tool bits. Common tool bit types are: square end cutters, ball end cutters, t-slot cutters, and shell mills. Square end cutters can mill square slots, pockets, and edges. Ball end cutters mill radiused slots or fillets. T-slot cutters mill exactly that: T-shaped slots. Shell end cutters are used for large flat surfaces and for angle cuts. There are variations of these tool types as well.

There are four critical angles of each cutting tool: end cutting edge angle, axial relief angle, radial relief angle, and radial rake angle.

Depending on the material being milled, and what task should be performed, different tool types and geometry may be used.  For instance, when milling a material like aluminium, it may be advantageous to use a tool with very deep, polished flutes, a very sharp cutting edge and high rake angles.  When machining a tough material such as stainless steel, however, shallow flutes and a squared-off cutting edge will optimize material removal and tool life.

A wide variety of materials are used to produce the cutting tools.  Carbide inserts are the most common because they are good for high production milling. High speed steel is commonly used when a special tool shape is needed, not usually used for high production processes.  Ceramics inserts are typically used in high speed machining with high production.  Diamond inserts are typically used on products that require tight tolerances, typically consisting of high surface qualities (nonferrous or non-metallic materials).

In the early 90s, use of coatings became more common. Coatings can provide various benefits including wear resistance, reduction of friction to assist with chip evacuation, and increased heat resistance.  Most of these coatings are referred to by their chemical composition.
 

Though PCD veins is not a coating, some end mills are manufactured with a 'vein' of polycrystalline diamond.  The vein is formed in a high temperature-high pressure environment.  The vein is formed in a blank and then the material is ground out along the vein to form the cutting edge.  Although the tools can be very costly, they can last many times longer than other tooling.

Advances in end mill coatings are being made, however, with coatings such as Amorphous Diamond and nanocomposite PVD coatings beginning to be seen at high-end shops (as of 2004).

Although coatings have a typical color, manufacturers may modify the coating process or add additives to change the appearance without affecting the performance as part of their branding. Bright blues, reds and turquoise are among the "unnatural" colors.

End mills are typically made on CNC (computer numeric controlled) tool and cutter grinder machines under high-pressure lubricants such as water, water-soluble oil, and high-flashpoint oil.  Grinding inside the machine is accomplished with abrasive wheels mounted on a spindle (and in some cases, multiple spindles).  Depending on what material is being ground, these wheels are made with industrial diamond (when grinding tungsten carbide), cubic boron nitride (when grinding cobalt steel), and other materials (when grinding, for instance, ceramics), set in a bond (sometimes copper).

Flute Types 
Single: Is used to remove lots of material at a very fast rate. Traditionally used in a roughing operation.

2 Flute: Allows for more chips to be removed from the part. Primarily used in slotting and pocketing operations in non-ferrous materials.

3 Flute: Similar to the 2 Flute end mill but can be used to cut ferrous and non-ferrous materials

4+ Flute: Designed to run at faster feed rates but due to having more flutes it causes issues with chip removal.

Types of Operations Using End Mills 
Roughing: the purpose is to remove a big chunk of material from workpieces, sometimes to get rid of excess material in order to get closer to the final shape. It attempts to get really close to the finalized shape. Traditionally it's the first major operation in the machining process. 

Contouring/Profiling: this is a process used to mill different surfaces such as flat or irregular ones. This type of process can be done during the roughing or finishing phase of the overall operation. 

Facing: is an operation used to face the part down to specified dimension. Facing can be done using end mills or a special face mill.

Pocketing/Slotting: this is a process to make a pocket on the inside of the part. A pocket can be shallow or deep, depending on specs.

See also 
 Burr (cutter)
 CNC pocket milling

References 

 Robert H. Todd, Dell K. Allen, Leo Alting, "Manufacturing Processes Reference Guide", Industrial Press Inc., New York, 1994 pg 49-53

Metalworking cutting tools